Eric Carter may refer to:

 Eric Carter (BMX rider) (born 1970), American BMX rider
 Eric Carter (pilot) (1920–2021), British Royal Air Force pilot
 Eric Carter (Canadian football) (born 1969), Canadian football player
 Eric Carter (Kansas politician) (born 1972), American politician and member of the Kansas House of Representatives
 Eric Carter (born Éric Rima), Mauritian musician and vocalist
 Eric Carter, character from 24: Legacy